The 1954 Iowa Hawkeyes football team represented the University of Iowa in the 1954 Big Ten Conference football season.

Schedule

Roster

Postseason awards
Cal Jones - Consensus First-team All-American

References

Iowa
Iowa Hawkeyes football seasons
Iowa Hawkeyes football